Ottawa By-law and Regulatory Services (BLRS) is a branch of the municipal government of Ottawa, Ontario. It enforces local by-laws including parking, noise, property standards, animal control, and other areas regulated by the City of Ottawa.

History
The current conceptualization of By-law Services came into existence on January 1, 2001 when the City of Ottawa Act, 1999 amalgamated the former Region of Ottawa-Carleton and the former municipalities of Ottawa, Nepean, Kanata, Gloucester, Vanier, Cumberland, West Carleton Township, Goulburn Township, Rideau Township, Osgoode Township, and Rockcliffe Park into the single-tier municipality of Ottawa. As a result, the regulatory and parking enforcement services of these former municipalities were consolidated within the City of Ottawa By-law and Regulatory Services Branch.

By-law Services provides regulatory services to help protect the public health, safety and property rights of citizens by maintaining a standard quality of life through timely and effective enforcement of by-laws enacted by city council and other pieces of provincial legislation delegated to the city by the provincial government. These enforcement activities may include: yard maintenance, property standards and zoning, noise control, animal care and control, parking and traffic enforcement, graffiti management, taxi licensing and inspections, nuisance abatement, and business licensing. These enforcement and regulatory activities provided by the Service are similar to Code Enforcement Officers in the United States. However, Code Enforcement is narrower in scope and only encompasses what is considered as property standards and zoning.

Call volumes for bylaw enforcement has increased over the years. In 2005, the City received 53,718 by-law complaints and this has increased to approximately 73,000 in 2011. This increase in call volume can be attributed to the introduction of 3-1-1 in 2005. Contact with the Service may be initiated by phone through 3-1-1 or online through ServiceOttawa.

Employees at the branch who conducts enforcement activities are known as bylaw enforcement officers. Under s. 15(2) of the Police Services Act, 1990, by-law officers are deemed to be peace officers for the purpose of enforcing municipal by-laws.

By-law Services, along with the Ottawa Fire Service, the Ottawa Paramedic Service, and the Security & Emergency Management Branch fall under the umbrella of the Emergency & Protective Services Department that reports to a General Manager of the department.

Organization
By-law Services employs a Stratified Enforcement model where different tasks within the branch are handled by different classes of employees. Officers are assigned to the following tasks within the Service:
 Licensing
 Parking operations
 Property standards and zoning
 General enforcement (noise, animal care and control)

The Service is structured hierarchically with a defined system of supervision. The highest ranking position within the Service is the Chief of By-law followed by Program Managers, Coordinators, Supervisors, and Officers. At the current moment in time there are no formal ranking structure for the officers.

Inter-agency relationships
By-law Services operates daily from 0700 - 0200. The Ottawa Police Service provides enforcement outside the Service's operational hours. The only exception is between November 15 and April 1 when winter snow operations are in effect. When there is a prediction of 7 cm or more of snow being forecast by Environment Canada, a Winter overnight parking ban will come into effect. Further, the Service will supplement the City's snow removal operations during this period by towing vehicles to nearby streets so that city crews could remove snow that has accumulated on the side of the road.

By-law maintains a working relationship with the Ottawa Police Service as many of the Service's activities supplements or is outside police mandate. The relationship is especially important at night as By-law enforces all categories of noise complaints that may require police support.

The Service also maintains a close relationship with the Ottawa Humane Society (OHS) due to the service's mandate of animal care and control. The City of Ottawa contracts out the Municipal Animal Shelter to OHS. All dogs and cats that are picked up by By-law Services are transported to the OHS facilities located at 245 West Hunt Club Road. Furthermore, By-law also works closely with the Ministry of Natural Resources as it helps coordinate activates in regards to large wild mammal response.

In recent years, By-law has had increasing concerns about external private parking enforcement agencies issuing their own parking tickets on private property. Concerns for these private parking tickets include the fact that there is a lack of training for agents who issue these tickets, the fact that the tickets look like city-issued tickets, the fact that the tickets act more like invoices, and the fact that there is no opportunity for judicial review. As a result, the City of Ottawa passed a by-law in 2011 that amended By-law 2002-189. This amendment would allow the city, through By-law Services, to license, regulate and govern private parking enforcement agencies operating within the city. First, this amendment would require private agents to be trained to city standards. Second, city tickets are to be issued instead of private tickets. Third, all tickets will be subject to judicial review by the Ontario Court of Justice (Provincial Offences Court) at 100 Constellation Cres. This by-law came into effect on February 1, 2012.

Operations
The City of Ottawa By-law Services has one facility located on Industrial Ave with dispatch services provided out of City Hall on Laurier Ave.

Patrol operations
 East enforcement
 West enforcement
 Parking operations

Other enforcement operations
 Licensing and taxi enforcement
 Tobacco enforcement
 Property standards and zoning enforcement
 Covid-19 Mandate enforcement
 Special teams

Support services
 3-1-1 communications
 By-law dispatch (under operational control of Security & Emergency Management)
 Spay and neuter clinic

Business services
 Business licensing
 Taxi licensing
 Market operations (Byward and Parkdale Markets)
 Special events

Fleet
The majority of marked vehicles within the Service were Chevrolet Cobalts and Pontiac G5s before they started using Ford Explorers, which are currently the majority of their fleet. These vehicles and other sedans are primarily used by Parking, Licensing, and Property Standards officers. Specially fitted vehicles (usually vans and trucks) are used by General Enforcement officers as these vehicles are fitted with animal cages that facilitates animal pick up. The Service also employs a variety of unmarked vehicles to supplement its operations.

See also

 Parking enforcement officer

References

External links

 Municipal Law Enforcement Officers' Association of Ontario
 City of Ottawa

Municipal government of Ottawa
Law enforcement agencies of Ontario